is a 2016 Japanese television documentary film directed by Kaku Arakawa. The film follows the Academy Award-winning animator and filmmaker Hayao Miyazaki in the wake of his decision to retire, including documenting the early production of his 2018 short film Boro the Caterpillar.

References

External links
 

Hayao Miyazaki
Japanese documentary films
2010s Japanese-language films
2016 television films
2016 films
2016 documentary films
Studio Ghibli
2010s Japanese films